Billie Ave. is the debut studio album by Canadian singer Alicia Moffet, released on June 26, 2020. The name of the album refers to Alicia's daughter Billie Lou Mentink, who was born on July 20, 2019. Some of the songs were written with other artists, including Milk & Bone and Jonathan Roy.

Track listing

References

External links 
Billie Ave. on Genius

2020 debut albums
Pop albums by Canadian artists